Lee Yung-te (born 30 May 1955) is a Taiwanese politician who is the current Minister of Culture. He served as the Minister of the Hakka Affairs Council from March 2005 to March 2008 and was reappointed to the position in April 2016.

Education
Lee obtained his bachelor's degree in politics from National Chengchi University in 1976 and master's degree in communication from Stanford University in the United States in 1991.

Political life

Hakka Affairs Council
On 15 March 2005, Lee was appointed as Minister of Hakka Affairs Council. During his tenure, he organized the first Hakka Language Certification Exam in Taiwan. He also composed the first Hakka musical, My Daughter's Wedding and filmed a Hakka movie, 1895. In terms of music, he brought Hakka music into the National Concert Hall in Taipei and organized the first Hakka Expo in Taiwan.

Personal life
Lee is of Hakka ethnicity. He has two marriages. His second wife is the member of Legislative Yuan from Kaohsiung, Chiu Yi-ying. Lee and his second wife Chiu Yi-ying registered their marriage in April 2011 and held their wedding banquet on 5 January 2013 in Kaohsiung. He and his first wife from previous marriage have a daughter born in 1988.

References

Taiwanese Ministers of Culture
Taiwanese politicians of Hakka descent
Deputy mayors of Kaohsiung
Living people
1955 births
National Chengchi University alumni
Stanford University alumni
Democratic Progressive Party (Taiwan) politicians